Jacek Poniedziałek (born 6 August 1965, Kraków) is a Polish film, theatre and television actor as well as a theatre director and translator.

Life and career
He was born on 6 August 1965 in Kraków and grew up in the city's Olsza II District. In 1990, he graduated from the National Academy of Theatre Arts in Kraków. He received his diploma on the basis of his performance in the role of Walter in Robert Musil's Early Drafts for The Man Without Qualities directed by Krystian Lupa. During his studies in Kraków, he began his long collaboration with theatre director Krzysztof Warlikowski.  He was hired by the German director Karin Beier for his staging of Shakespeare's A Midsummer Night's Dream in a theatre in Düsseldorf. He performed at such institutions as the KTO Theatre in Kraków, the Juliusz Słowacki Theatre (1990-1992) and the Old Theatre (1992-1997). In 1997, he started working at the National Theatre in Warsaw. Between 1999–2006, he performed at the Variety Theatre and since 2008, he has been working at the New Theatre in Warsaw.

He also directed a number of plays such as Enter. Slamowana i śpiewana historia miłosna między dwoma mężczyznami, których dzieli bardzo wiele (New Theatre in Warsaw, 2010), Cat on a Hot Tin Roof (People's Theatre in Kraków, 2013) and The Glass Menagerie (Jan Kochanowski Theatre in Opole, 2014) by Tennessee Williams and Who's Afraid of Virginia Woolf? by Edward Albee (Polonia Theatre in Warsaw, 2016).

He made his film debut in 1999 by appearing in Stanisław Kuźnik's film Moja Angelika. He also starred in such films as Borys Lankosz's Reverse (2009), Jerzy Hoffman's Battle of Warsaw 1920 (2011), Grzegorz Królikiewicz's Sąsiady (2014), Borys Lankosz's Ziarno prawdy (2015) and Krzysztof Zanussi's Eter (2018).

He has also translated a number of stage plays into Polish including Sarah Kane's Cleansed (2001), Hanoch Levin's Krum (2005), Tony Kushner's Angels in America (2007), Tennessee Williams's A Streetcar Named Desire (2010) and Bernard-Marie Koltès's The End (2010).

Personal life
He has a sister Anna (b. 1964) and he had two brothers Bolesław (1954-2014) and Józef (1956-1976). In the 1980s, he was fascinated by Polish rock band Maanam and at the age of 17, he met and befriended its lead singer Kora. At high school, he set up an amateur theatre with his friends where they staged Andrzej Bursa's Count Cagliostro's Animals. His academic teachers were Jan Peszek, Krzysztof Globisz and Jerzy Stuhr.

In 2005, he publicly came out as gay. He was in an 18-year long relationship with theatre director Krzysztof Warlikowski. In 2019, he took part in a social campaign Stoję po stronie młodzieży launched by Campaign Against Homophobia and a photo shoot for the Replika gay magazine.

Appearances in television and film
1999: Moja Angelika as Alek
2000–2008: M jak miłość as Rafał Lubomski
2001–2002: Marzenia do spełnienia as an agency worker
2003: Przemiany as Snaut
2004: Trzeci as Paweł
2005: Magda M. as Rafał Żywiecki
2007: Ekipa as Wojciech Wandurski
2008: Boisko bezdomnych as a priest
2008: Hela w opałach as Eryk Krzyżanowski
2008: Izolator (Warsaw Dark) as Remik
2008: 39 i pół as Kundel
2009: Na Wspólnej as Nowicki
2009: Reverse as a dignitary
2010: Klub szalonych dziewic as Jan Szwarc
2011: Battle of Warsaw 1920 as Józef Haller
2014: Sąsiady as husband
2014: Na krawędzi 2 as Jakub Rokosz
2015: Ziarno prawdy as Klejnocki
2018: Druga szansa as Marek Strzałkiewicz
2018: Eter as Doctor
2019: Pod powierzchnią as attorney Kot

See also
Polish cinema
Polish theatre
Polish Film Awards

References

1965 births
Living people
Polish male actors
Polish male television actors
Polish theatre directors
Polish gay actors
Male actors from Kraków